Spectrin beta chain, erythrocyte is a protein that in humans is encoded by the SPTB gene.

References

Further reading